Eupatorium luchuense is a plant species in the family Asteraceae found in Taiwan.

References

luchuense